The Roman Elegies (originally published under the title Erotica Romana in Germany, later Römische Elegien) is a cycle of twenty-four poems by Johann Wolfgang von Goethe.

They reflect Goethe's Italian Journey from 1786 to 1788 and celebrate the sensuality and vigour of Italian and Classical culture. The elegies are also a loving tribute to Goethe's companion, Christiane Vulpius, whom he met in 1788 on his return from Italy.

References

External links
 
 Römische Elegien at Projekt Gutenberg
 

Poetry by Johann Wolfgang von Goethe
1795 poems
German poetry collections